Mylord (or cabriolet or cab phaeton) is a type of horse drawn coach. Originally of French design, they became popular during the 1830s in Central Europe, especially in Bohemia, Moravia and Silesia, as well as in Austria. Originally they were called cabriolet or cab phaeton, however later the address to an English noblemen came to use.

The Mylord type of coach was the base for the first Central European car, the Präsident made by Nesselsdorfer Wagenbau-Fabriks-Gesellschaft (today Tatra, a. s.).

References

Carriages